Olga Podrazhanskaya (born 29 May 1948) is an Israeli chess player who holds the title of Woman International Master (WIM, 1982) and won team gold medal in 7th Chess Olympiad (women) in 1976. She is a three-time winner the Israeli Women Chess Championship (1974, 1976, 1980).

Chess career
In 1969 Olga Podrazhanskaya shared 3rd place in Leningrad Women Chess Championship. In 1971 she won Leningrad Women Chess blitz championship. In 1971 she won Leningrad Women Chess blitz championship. In 1973 she won Soviet sport society Lokomotiv Women Chess Championship.

Moved to Israel in 1973. She won three Israeli Women Chess Championships: in 1974, 1976, and 1982 (together with Ljuba Kristol).

Olga Podrazhanskaya played for Israel in the Women's Chess Olympiads:
 In 1974, at first board in the 6th Chess Olympiad (women) in Medellín (+9, =2, -2),
 In 1976, at third board in the 7th Chess Olympiad (women) in Haifa (+4, =1, -3) and won team gold medal,
 In 1980, at third board in the 9th Chess Olympiad (women) in Valletta (+2, =3, -2),
 In 1988, at third board in the 28th Chess Olympiad (women) in Thessaloniki (+6, =2, -5),
 In 1990, at second board in the 29th Chess Olympiad (women) in Novi Sad (+7, =0, -6).

Literature
 Игорь Бердичевский. Шахматная еврейская энциклопедия. Москва: Русский шахматный дом, 2016.

References

External links

Olga Podrazhanskaya chess games at 365Chess.com

1948 births
Sportspeople from Saint Petersburg
Israeli female chess players
Russian female chess players
Soviet female chess players
Chess Olympiad competitors
Living people